The 2016 Sun Belt Conference men's soccer tournament, was the 9th edition of the tournament. It determined the Sun Belt Conference's automatic berth into the 2016 NCAA Division I Men's Soccer Championship.

Coastal Carolina won the Sun Belt title, making it their first Sun Belt championship, but their 13th overall conference tournament title. The Chanticleers defeated Georgia State in the championship, 1–0.

Seeding 

All six programs qualified for the Sun Belt Tournament.

Bracket

Matches

First round

Semifinals

Final

Awards

References 

2016
Sun Belt Conference Men's Soccer